A Forest Apart is a 2003 Star Wars ebook written by Troy Denning. The novel is set before Tatooine Ghost in the Star Wars expanded universe timeline.
The novel is also available as part of the Tatooine Ghost paperback.

In the novel, Lumpawarrump heads to Coruscant to spend time with his father, Chewbacca. The story evolves around the Wookiees' adventure there and Chewbacca dealing with Lumpawarrump's disobedience.

Plot
While there, Lumpawarrump finds a burglar at Han and Leia Solo's apartment and pursues him into Coruscant's dangerous under-levels. Chewbacca and his wife, Mallatobuck, follow their son to find him fighting the burglar in the company of a band of thieves. The burglar and the thieves flee when they arrive. Chewbacca notices that Leia's datapad was stolen by the group. Before they can stop him, Lumpawarrump runs off to recover the datapad. When Chewbacca and Mallatobuck find him again, the burglars are carrying him into one of the secret detention centers Palpatine kept in the undercity. Chewbacca saves Lumpawarrump, but Mallatobuck is taken in his stead and dragged away. Chewbacca and Lumpawarrump learn that the burglars were attempting to assassinate the New Republic's leaders so Chewbacca comms Han to inform him of the plot. Chewbacca and Lumpawarrump invade the enemies' base to find an advanced IT-3 interrogation droid attempting to brainwash Malla into believing that the Solos are a danger to her child. Chewbacca attacks and frees Mallatobuck. Han then arrives with a New Republic security company, chases off the last of the pursuers, and takes Chewbacca to the nearest medical center. Security learns that this was a plot by the presumed deceased Ysanne Isard to seek the destruction of the New Republic's government after the Krytos Virus failed to destroy Coruscant. Han tries to free Chewbacca from his life debt again but the Wookiees refused once again. In the end Lumpawarrump heads back to Kashyyyk after learning a lesson about listening to his parents.

See also

 Star Wars Holiday Special

External links
 Amazon.com Listing
 Official CargoBay Listing

2003 novels
2003 science fiction novels
Star Wars Legends novels
Del Rey books
Books based on Star Wars